The 1997 Tallahassee mayoral election was held on February 4 and February 25, 1997 to elect the Mayor of Tallahassee, Florida. It was the first election since 1919 that the post of the mayor was directly elected.

Incumbent mayor Scott Maddox was elected by the City Commission to serve as the mayor of Tallahassee in 1995. Following November 1996 referendum where citizens of Tallahassee approved popular elections for mayors. The first round of voting was held on February 4, 1997 between Maddox, Charles Billings, and Anita L. Davis.

A runoff was held on February 25, 1997 where Maddox gathered over 51% of the vote defeating Billings, thus becoming the direct-mayor elect.

Results

References

1997 Florida elections
1997
1997 United States mayoral elections